Kates Needle is a mountain in the Stikine Icecap region of the Alaska-British Columbia border west of the junction of the Stikine River and Porcupine River. The summit has also been known as Boundary Peak 70.

References

External links
 
 

Boundary Ranges
Three-thousanders of British Columbia
Mountains of Alaska
Mountains of Petersburg Borough, Alaska
Canada–United States border
International mountains of North America